Shut Up & Sing: How Elites from Hollywood, Politics, and the UN Are Subverting America is the second book written by conservative radio show host Laura Ingraham. The book was first published in 2003 by Regnery Publishing, and details Laura's views on people she calls "elites" from the world of politics, to educational institutions, to the entertainment industry.

2003 non-fiction books
Books about politics of the United States